Ni'lin is a Palestinian town in the Ramallah and al-Bireh Governorate in the central West Bank, located  west of Ramallah. The town's total land area consists of approximately 15,000 dunams of which 660 is urban. Under the Oslo II agreement, 93% of town lands has been classed as 'Area C'.

Most of the town's inhabitants rely on agriculture for income and prior to the outbreak of the Second Intifada, many had jobs in construction in Israel. According to the Palestinian Central Bureau of Statistics, the town had a population of approximately 4,750 inhabitants in mid-year 2006.

Situated 262 meters (860 feet) above sea level, Ni'lin has mild winters and hot, dry summers with temperatures averaging 32 °C (88 °F) during the day.

History
Potsherds have been found dating back to the late Iron Age (8th–7th century B.C.E.), and the Hellenistic, Byzantine, Crusader/Ayyubid, Mamluk, and early Ottoman periods.

A person named Isaac de Naelein is mentioned in a Crusader text of the year 1167 in relation to nearby Casale St. Maria (Aboud).

Ottoman era
In 1517, Ni'lin was incorporated into the Ottoman Empire with the rest of Palestine, and in 1596 it appeared in the tax registers as being in the Nahiya of Ramla of the Liwa of Gaza. It had a population of 72 households, all Muslims. The villagers paid a fixed tax rate of 25% on agricultural products, including wheat, barley, summer crops, olive trees, fruit trees, goats, and/or beehives, and a press for olives or grapes, in addition to occasional revenues; a total of 3,500 akçe. All of the revenue went to a Waqf.

In 1838, it was noted as a Muslim village (called Na'lin) in the Ibn Humar area in the District of Er-Ramleh.

An Ottoman village list of about 1870 showed that Ni'lin had 156 houses and a population of 493, though the population count included only men. It was described as bordering Deir Qaddis.

In 1882, the PEF's Survey of Western Palestine described Ni'lin (called N'alin) as a "large village on high ground, surrounded by olives, and supplied by cisterns."

On 28 December 1917, during World War I, the village was captured by the British from Ottoman forces. The British held the line from here eastwards to Beitin and westwards to the coast, north of Jaffa.

British Mandate era
In the 1922 census of Palestine, conducted by the British Mandate authorities, the village, (named Na'lin), had a population of 1,160 inhabitants, all Muslims, while in the 1931 census the population of Ni'lin was 1249 (one Christian and the rest Muslim), in 299 inhabited houses.

In the 1945 statistics the population of Ni'lin was 1,420, all Muslims, who owned 15,875 dunams of land according to an official land and population survey. Of this, 5,921 dunams were plantations and irrigable land, 3,053 dunams were used for cereals, while 29 dunams were built-up (urban) land.

Jordanian era
In the wake of the 1948 Arab–Israeli War, and after the 1949 Armistice Agreements, Ni'lin came under Jordanian rule. It was annexed by Jordan in 1950.

In 1961, the population of Ni'lin was 2,055.

Post 1967
After the Six-Day War in 1967, Ni'lin came under Israeli military occupation.

Since the 1995 accords, 93% of town lands has been classed as Area C, and the remaining 7% as Area B.

According to the Applied Research Institute in Jerusalem, Israel has confiscated Ni'lin land for the construction of three Israeli settlements: 945 dunams seized for Hashmona'im, 645 dunams for Mattityahu, and 384 dunams for Modi'in Illit.

On 22 March 2020, Sufyan Nawwaf al-Khawaja (age 32) from Ni'lin was killed after being shot in the head by the Israeli army. The Israelis said he was throwing stones, while his family said he was buying supplies before the shut-down imposed due to the coronavirus pandemic.

Barrier protests

During 2008 and 2009, the residents of Ni'lin and international activists staged weekly demonstrations against a nearby expansion of the Israeli West Bank barrier. It has been estimated that the completion of the barrier will remove one third of Ni'lin's land.

The first of escalating incidents at the anti-barrier protest demonstrations led to the fatal shooting of 10-year-old Ahmed Moussa on 29 July 2008. The incident occurred when a group of mostly teenage boys had gone to the barrier construction site outside Ni'ilin, where there were no security personnel, the boys began removing razor wire. A preliminary Israeli police probe has found that Israeli border policemen used live ammunition to disperse the group and that one of the bullets likely killed Ahmed Moussa. During the demonstration, 15 others were injured by rubber coated steel bullets. The funeral of Ahmed Moussa was marred by a distinct up-swing in violence. The permanent stationing of a Border Police force, ordered by OC Central Command Maj.-Gen. Gadi Shamni, on the outskirts of the village where the daily demonstrations are held, infuriated marchers in the funeral procession. Yousef Ahmed Younis Amera (18) was declared brain-dead in a Ramallah hospital on Wednesday 30 July 2008 after being shot in the head with a rubber-coated steel bullet and finally died on Monday 4 August 2008. On 5 August 2008, Israeli police said that they had detained a border policeman and placed him under house arrest in connection with the death of Ahmed Moussa.

In the second week of August 2008, twenty-two unarmed civilians (including eight children) were shot with metal-coated rubber bullets at protests in Ni'lin and Bil'in villages (Ramallah). Israeli forces in the occupied territories have begun using a new method of crowd control in Ni'lin. A mix of weak sewage water with animal manure and chemicals has been nicknamed "skunk" because of its powerful smell; the mix induces vomiting when sprayed on demonstrators.

On 28 December, during a demonstration against the Israeli assault on Gaza that had started the previous day, Mohamed Khawaja (19) was shot in the head by the Israeli military, and Arafat Khawaja (22) was shot in the back. Mohamed Srour was shot in the leg. Arafat died on the scene while Mohamed Khawaja was declared braindead in hospital and died on 31 December. These incidents were brought to the attention of the United Nations Fact Finding Mission on the Gaza Conflict by witnesses Mohamed Srour and Jonathan Pollak at the Mission's Public Hearings in Geneva on 5 July 2009.

The regular clashes here came more sharply into the international spotlight when a 38-year-old U.S. citizen named Tristan Anderson, of Oakland, California  was struck in the head by a tear gas canister fired by Israeli forces on 13 March 2009, during demonstrations against the barrier. The impact caused massive damage to Anderson's frontal lobe and to his eye. He required several brain surgeries at a Tel Aviv hospital.

On 5 June 2009, Yousef Aqel Srour (36) was shot with 0.22 caliber live ammunition during a demonstration. He was pronounced dead upon arrival at a hospital in Ramallah.

On 6 November 2009, activists marking the twentieth anniversary of the fall of the Berlin Wall managed to topple a small part of the wall that cuts through the village's land; the first time Palestinian demonstrators succeeded in toppling a part of Israel's concrete barrier.

In March 2010, the Israeli army designated Ni'lin, (together with nearby village Bil'in), as a "closed military area" each Friday. This was to last until August 2010.

Omri Borberg

On 7 July 2008, 17-year-old Salam Kanaan filmed an incident where an Israeli battalion commander (Lt. Col. Omri Borberg of Armored Battalion, 71) was holding the arm of a handcuffed and blindfolded Palestinian detainee (Ashraf Abu Rahma of Bil'in) while the subordinate shoots the detainee in the foot. A second polygraph test on Tuesday 29 July 2008 has cast doubts on the testimony of Lt. Col Borberg. After meeting with OC Northern Command Maj.-Gen. Gadi Eizenkot, Borberg agreed to take a 10-day leave of absence while IDF Judge Advocate-General (JAG) Brig.-Gen. Avichai Mandelblitt made the decision of whether or not to press charges against the battalion commander. Accused by the army of "severe moral failure", the Battalion commander is to be reassigned to another post and will face the relatively minor charge of "unworthy conduct". Israeli human rights groups B'Tselem, Yesh Din, the Association for Civil Rights, and the Public Committee Against Torture have criticized the Israeli army's disciplining of Borberg as lenient and have asked the Israeli military Judge Advocate General to suspend legal proceedings against both the lieutenant colonel involved and Staff Sergeant "L" who fired the shot to enable a challenge to be mounted against the decision to charge the two with the relatively light offense of "inappropriate conduct". The Ha'aretz editorial comments that: The opportunity to send a message of total intolerance of shooting a person in shackles has been missed.

On 19 August 2008, the Military hearing against Borberg and Staff Sergeant "L" was suspended following the B'Tselem petition. On 28 September the Israeli high court asked the JAG to reconsider the charges against Borberg and Staff Sergeant "L".

Footnotes

Bibliography

External links
 Throne villages, with Al Khawaja Palace in Ne'leen, RIWAQ
Backgrounder on Ni'lin and effects of the wall at IMEU.net
Stop the Wall
Ni`lin on Palestineremembered.com
Ni'lin town's struggle against the wall
Ni’lin Town (Fact Sheet), Applied Research Institute–Jerusalem (ARIJ)
Ni’lin Town Profile, ARIJ
Ni'lin, aerial photo, ARIJ
Locality Development Priorities and Needs in Ni’lin Town, ARIJ
Survey of Western Palestine, Map 14:  IAA, Wikimedia commons 

Ramallah and al-Bireh Governorate
Towns in the West Bank
Articles containing video clips
Throne villages
Municipalities of the State of Palestine